Faircloth is a surname and a given name. A variant form is Fairclough. Notable people with the name include:

 As a surname
 Art Faircloth (1921–2010), American football player
 Earl Faircloth (1920–1995), American politician and lawyer
 Frank M. Faircloth (1820–1900), Union naval officer
 Frederic Herbert Faircloth (1870–1925), Australian architect
 John Faircloth (born 1939), American politician
 Larry V. Faircloth (born 1948), American politician
 Lauch Faircloth (born 1928), American politician
 Rags Faircloth (1892–1953), American baseball player
 Sean Faircloth, American writer and politician
 Wayne Faircloth (born 1953), American legislator from Texas
 William T. Faircloth (1829–1900), American jurist

 As a given name
 Faircloth Barnes (19292011), American pastor and gospel musician